Microcolona emporica is a moth in the family Elachistidae. It is found in Sri Lanka.

The wingspan is about 12 mm. The forewings are brownish-ochreous, somewhat sprinkled irregularly with blackish. There is a patch of blackish suffusion extending along the costa from the base to two-thirds. The hindwings are dark grey.

References

Moths described in 1917
Microcolona
Moths of Asia